Kuramochi Dam is an earthfill dam located in Chiba Prefecture in Japan. The dam is used for irrigation. The catchment area of the dam is 0.4 km2. The dam impounds about 14  ha of land when full and can store 77 thousand cubic meters of water. The construction of the dam was started on 1967 and completed in 1968.

References

Dams in Chiba Prefecture
1968 establishments in Japan